The men's decathlon at the 1969 European Athletics Championships was held in Athens, Greece, at Georgios Karaiskakis Stadium on 17 and 18 September 1969.

Medalists

Results

Final
17/18 September

†:The Dutch athlete Edward de Noorlander initially finished 6th, but was disqualified for the use of amphetamine.  This was the first disqualification for doping in athletics.

Participation
According to an unofficial count, 24 athletes from 18 countries participated in the event.

 (1)
 (1)
 (2)
 (1)
 (1)
 (3)
 (1)
 (1)
 (1)
 (1)
 (1)
 (1)
 (1)
 (3)
 (1)
 (1)
 (2)
 (1)

References

Decathlon
Combined events at the European Athletics Championships